Syndicate is a Bangladeshi crime thriller web series written and directed by Shihab Shaheen. It is produced by Redoan Rony. This is Chorki web platform show. It has seven episodes. It stars Afran Nisho, Nazifa Tushi and Tasnia Farin in lead roles.

The serial aired on 8 July 2022. Soon after the airing, the serial won the appreciation of the audience.

Plot
The questionable, mysterious Jisha, a bank officer, was killed by being thrown from the roof of the bank in the afternoon. Although everyone calls it suicide, Adnan, colleague and boyfriend of Jisha, thinks that she was killed in cold blood. Adnan is an IT officer with Asperger syndrome. He is running after a syndicate. He is assisted by his colleague and childhood friend Swarna.

Cast
 Afran Nisho - Habibur Rahman Adnan
 Nazifa Tushi - Jobaida Yasmin Zisha
 Tasnia Farin - Samia Sultana Swarna
 Shatabdi Wadud - Sohail
 Rashed Mamun Apu - Naseeruddin Hyder Ratan
 Nasir Uddin Khan - Shamsur Rahman Swapan/ Allen Swapan/ Rafiqul Islam
 Arnab Antu - Robin
 Athena Adhikari - Tithi
 Elina Shammi - Naila
 Zahid Islam
 Sharmeen Sharmi - Rupali Haider
 A.K. Azad Shetu - Suresh
 Fakhrul Bashar Masum - HR Head
 Samu Chowdhury - Chairman
 Saif Hussain - Farabi
 Rocky Khan
 Sanjay
 Shikha Khan Mou - Swarna's mother
 Dihan
 Sabita
 Hussain Nirob
 Sayem Samad
 Zulfikar is fickle
 Tuhin Chowdhury
 Ripa Ranjana

Episodes

Production
Shihab Shaheen earlier made a web series called Morichika. For his role, Afran Nisho had to undergo research on Asperger syndrome and also change his look. It was scheduled to shoot in December, 2021. The shooting of the web series started from 2 January 2022 in Uttara.

Reception
Khan Tajneen Ahsan of Somoy TV feels that Syndicate is comparable to any international quality content. She praised the performances of its actors especially Nisho. The web series has been streamed for 21598879 minutes breaking all the records of Chorki platform.

Music
Khayyam Sanu Sandhi has composed the music and written the lyrics for the serial. It has a song, voiced by Rehan Rasul and Musharrat Anchal.

References

External links
 Syndicate on Chorki
 

2022 web series debuts
2022 Bangladeshi television series debuts
Crime thriller web series
Bengali-language web series
Bangladeshi web series
Chorki original programming